The Fairbanks House (also known as the Maj. George R. Fairbanks House) is a historic site in Fernandina Beach, Florida. It was built in 1885 for George Rainsford Fairbanks. R. S. Schuyler was the building's architect. It is located at 227 South 7th Street. On June 4, 1973, it was added to the U.S. National Register of Historic Places.  Built as a surprise for his wife, it was reported not to have gone over well and became known as "Fairbanks Folly".

It operates as the Fairbanks House Bed & Breakfast.

Gallery

References

Further reading
Folly no more

External links
 Fairbanks House Bed & Breakfast
 Florida's Office of Cultural and Historical Programs
 Nassau County listings
 Great Floridians of Fernandina Beach
 

Houses on the National Register of Historic Places in Florida
Houses in Nassau County, Florida
Bed and breakfasts in Florida
National Register of Historic Places in Nassau County, Florida
1885 establishments in Florida
Houses completed in 1885
Fernandina Beach, Florida
Hotels in the Jacksonville metropolitan area